Arthur Wills Blundell Sandys Trumbull Windsor Hill, 4th Marquess of Downshire KP (6 August 1812 – 6 August 1868) was an Irish peer, styled Earl of Hillsborough until 1845.

Life
The eldest son of Arthur Hill, 3rd Marquess of Downshire, Hillsborough was educated at Eton and Christ Church, Oxford, where he matriculated in 1830. He was commissioned an ensign in the Royal South Down Militia, of which his father was colonel, on 4 June, and was commissioned lieutenant-colonel in the same on 10 September.

He was appointed Sheriff of County Down for 1834. From 1836 until 1845, he represented Down in Parliament, and was a justice of the peace for the county as well.

He became Marquess of Downshire on 12 April 1845 on the death of his father, and was appointed to his father's Militia colonelcy on 30 July. His English residence was Easthampstead Park in Berkshire, and he was appointed a deputy lieutenant of that county in 1852, and a Knight of the Order of St Patrick on 24 May 1859. He had Easthampstead Church rebuilt in 1867.

Family

On 23 August 1837, Hillsborough married Hon. Caroline Frances Stapleton Cotton, the eldest daughter of Stapleton Cotton, 1st Viscount Combermere. They had four children:

Arthur Hill, Viscount Kilwarlin (10 June 1841 – 28 June 1841)
Lady Alice Maria Hill (7 November 1842 – 25 February 1928), married Thomas Taylour, Earl of Bective and had issue
Arthur Hill, 5th Marquess of Downshire (1844–1874)
Col. Lord Arthur William Hill (1846–1931)

References

External links

1812 births
1868 deaths
People from Hillsborough, County Down
People from Bracknell
People educated at Eton College
Alumni of Christ Church, Oxford
British Militia officers
Deputy Lieutenants of Berkshire
English cricketers
Knights of St Patrick
Marylebone Cricket Club cricketers
Hillsborough, Arthur Hill, Earl of
High Sheriffs of Down
Hillsborough, Arthur Hill, Earl of
Hillsborough, Arthur Hill, Earl of
Hillsborough, Arthur Hill, Earl of
UK MPs who inherited peerages
Arthur
Arthur 4